Peak Time is an ongoing South Korean reality competition show created by JTBC. It premiered on February 15, 2023, and aired every Wednesday at 20:50 (KST) for the first two episodes before changing to 22:30 (KST) from the third episode onwards. It's being simultaneously broadcast through TV Asahi and Abema in Japan and is available for streaming on TVING and Viki in selected regions.

Hosted by Lee Seung-gi, the program provides a stage for already debuted K-pop boy bands to once again prove their skills to audiences outside of South Korea and compete for the "Worldwide Idol" title. The final Top 6 teams will get the special benefit of having their names disclosed while performing on the show and being able to hold a concert. Meanwhile, the winning team will receive a monetary prize of  million, an album release, and a global showcase.

Background and production

Development
JTBC released a teaser video for Peak Time on June 20, 2022, in hopes of recruiting already debuted K-pop boy bands to participate in the show. Under the supervision of JTBC chief producer Yoon Hyun-joon and production director Ma Geon-young, who were both also involved in the production of the successful reality singing competition show Sing Again, the program aims to revitalize the careers of lesser-known Korean idols, regardless of their debut year. Ma commented that he "wanted to provide a platform" to those "who didn't have a chance to make themselves known to the public."

Lee Seung-gi, who also hosted both seasons of Sing Again, was recruited as Peak Time'''s host. In regards to choosing Lee, the production team noted his excellent wit and hosting skills during Sing Again, as well as his ability to sympathize well with the contestants, often providing musical advice, being a musician himself.

The panel of judges, consisting of eight people, was announced on December 20, 2022. The production team had enlisted former Sing Again judges Kyuhyun and Mino to be part of the panel, with the former being assigned as the lead judge of the show. The panel also includes Jay Park, Kim Sung-kyu, Lee Gi-kwang, Tiffany Young, SM Entertainment performance director Shim Jae-won, as well as prominent songwriter and producer Ryan S. Jhun. Regarding their roles as judges, Jhun aims to instill the importance of teamwork in the contestants, while Young hopes to impart the skills that she has learned through her experiences as a K-pop idol. Moonbyul joined the panel starting from the second round after Mino stepped down to fulfill his mandatory military service.

Broadcast schedule

Voting system

The official website and Naver NOW app are the primary platforms to vote for the contestants.

The first voting phase was opened to the general public on February 16, 2022, after Episode 2, and ended on March 15 after Episode 6. Viewers were allowed to vote for up to two teams and two individuals daily, regardless of their team membership.

Contestants
The show's contestants make up 24 teams, each representing an hour of the day, following the 24-hour clock notation (e.g. Team 01:00, Team 02:00, etc. until Team 24:00). With the exception of Team 24:00, each team represents a K-pop boy band that has already debuted or is at the cusp of debuting. Team 24:00 was created by the judging panel from a pool of individual applicants or "1-member teams". These ten contestants auditioned for the program without their fellow bandmates, as they were not able to participate due to varying reasons. These individual contestants include Gon from Argon (debuted in 2019), Heedo from B.I.G (2014), Kim Byung-joo from Xeno-T (2013), Kim Hyun-jae from Black6ix (2017), Kim Shin from Team X (2019), Moon Jongup from B.A.P (2012), Minjae from Spectrum (2018), Minseong from Varsity (2017), Taeseon from TRCNG (2017), and Wontak from Rainz (2017). Applicants that were not chosen by the judges were eliminated.

On March 6, 2023, bullying allegations against Kim Hyun-jae of Team 24:00 surfaced from within a popular South Korean online community, leading to his removal from the show on March 13. In a press release from March 9, the producers of Peak Time condemned school bullying and violence and stated that they are leading a "careful investigation" on the allegations to "clearly understand what [had] happened". But as this was not something that could be "concluded in a short amount of time", they ultimately decided to remove Kim.

Color key

Competition rounds
Survival round
Episodes 1 and 2, which both broadcast on February 15, 2023, encompassed the entirety of the survival round. In this round, the results were based solely on the judges' decision. The judges had PICK buttons that they must press to lock in their votes for any teams that piqued their interests while they are performing. Teams that received 6-8 PICKs automatically advanced to the next round, while those that received 3 or less were automatically eliminated. Any teams that received 4-5 were put on hold until further discussions were made between the judges. The 23 teams were divided into three sections: the Rookie section, the Booster section, and the Suspended Activity section. Instead of their original team names, the teams performed using new team names assigned to them by the show. These new names are based on the numbers that each team had drawn during a lottery that took place before the survival round. Each number represents an hour on the 24-hour clock notation. The teams are forbidden to disclose their original names until they get eliminated or reach Top 6. Full versions of team performances, whether broadcast or not, were uploaded to the Peak Time official YouTube channel.

Color key

At the tail end of the survival round, the 1-member teams were introduced and were invited to the stage to perform. After seeing the performances of the ten 1-member teams, the judges chose the individuals whom they wanted to form Team 24:00.

First round – Rival match
Also referred to as a "rival match", the first round was shown during the broadcasts of Episodes 3 and 4 that aired on February 22 and March 1, 2023, respectively. The judges divided the remaining 16 teams into eight rival pairs and assigned each pair with a specific performance theme. Each team within the pairs were also assigned to either the blue or the red corner. Teams were given three weeks to prepare for their performances with the help from experts provided by the show. The winning team from each pair was awarded a benefit, wherein their cumulative number of votes would be doubled at the end of the first phase of voting. The winners were decided by the judging panel. Each judge has blue and red PICK buttons through which they cast their votes on whom they thought should win in each match. When a tie occurred, which happened between Team 13:00 and Team 14:00, the winning team was decided after a discussion between the judges.

Color key

 Second round – Union match 
Introduced during the later half of Episode 4, the second round was announced to be an "union match", or a competition between alliances consisting of four teams. Each alliance was tasked to form three smaller units that would represent their unified team in a four-way battle for the rap, vocal, and dance positions. The rap unit must have a maximum number of five members, while the vocal unit must have six members at most. Only the dance unit had no member limit. The winning unit from each battle will be determined by the judges and will earn 2% of the total cumulative votes for the entire alliance. These additional votes will be added to the teams at the end of the first phase of voting. In addition, host Lee Seung-gi announced that one MVP will be selected for each unit, and the team to which the MVP belongs will earn 5% of the total cumulative votes as a benefit. The MVP selection was made by 25 special judges composed of experts from each field.

During the formation of the alliances, Teams 09:00, 20:00, and 11:00 were given the chance to select three teams to join them, forming Alliances A, B, and C, respectively. Teams that were not chosen in the end–namely, Teams 01:00, 04:00, 07:00, and 21:00–formed the last alliance, Alliance D. However, Team 11:00 was given the ability to switch Team 14:00 from Alliance B with Team 21:00 from Alliance D after being chosen by the majority of the 16 teams as the overall winner of the first round.

All alliances had three days and two nights to prepare for their performances. In each unit, members picked their leader (L) and center (C), who would showcase the highlight of their performance. The performances aired during Episodes 5 and 6, which broadcast on March 8 and 15, respectively.

Color key

 Global ranking history 

Discography
All releases were produced by SLL and Kakao Entertainment. Releases consist of live recordings of a few selected performances from each round.

 Survival round release 

First round releases

 Second round releases 

Reception
Critical responsePeak Time has become one of the "most viral TV show[s] in South Korea" after three episodes. Viewers noted that what sets the show apart from other competition series is "the cast's sincerity and passion for music".

Ratings
After the broadcast of the first three episodes, Peak Time'' reached Rakuten Viki's top 10 most watched shows in 14 countries, including United States, Canada, Bulgaria, Norway, and Australia.

Notes

References

External links
 
 
Peak Time at Naver 

JTBC original programming
2023 South Korean television series debuts
Korean-language television shows
South Korean variety television shows
South Korean music television shows
K-pop television series
Music competitions in South Korea
Reality music competition television series
Peak Time